Phragmacossia paghmana is a species of moth of the family Cossidae. It is found in Afghanistan and Pakistan.

References

Moths described in 1963
Zeuzerinae